The Commission scolaire des Affluents is a former francophone school district in the Canadian province of Quebec, headquartered in Repentigny. It comprises several primary schools and high schools across municipalities in the Lanaudière  region. The commission is overseen by a board of elected school trustees.

Schools
Secondary schools:
 École secondaire Armand-Corbeil (Terrebonne)
 École secondaire de l'Amitié (L'Assomption)
 École secondaire de l'Odyssée (Terrebonne)
 École secondaire Des Rives (Terrebonne)
 École secondaire des Trois-Saisons (Terrebonne)
 École secondaire du Coteau (Mascouche)
 École secondaire Félix-Leclerc (Repentigny)
 École secondaire Jean-Baptiste-Meilleur (Repentigny)
 École secondaire Jean-Claude-Crevier (Repentigny)
 École secondaire l'Envolée (Repentigny)
 École secondaire Le Prélude (Mascouche)
 École secondaire l'Horizon (Repentigny)
 École secondaire l'Impact (Mascouche)
 École secondaire Paul-Arseneau (L'Assomption)

Primary schools:
 Alphonse-Desjardins (Repentigny)
 au Point-du-Jour (L'Assomption)
 Aux 4 Vents (Mascouche)
 aux-Quatre-Vents (Saint-Sulpice)
 Bernard-Corbin (Terrebonne)
 de Charlemagne (Charlemagne) - Within the Édifice Ste-Marie-des-Anges, an institutional school
 de la Paix (Repentigny)
 de la Sablière (Terrebonne)
 de la Seigneurie (Mascouche)
 de la Source (Mascouche)
 de l'Aubier (Terrebonne)
 de l'Étincelle (Terrebonne)
 de l'Orée-des-Bois (Terrebonne)
 des Hauts-Bois (Mascouche)
 des Moissons (Repentigny)
 des Pionniers (Terrebonne)
 du Boisé (Terrebonne)
 du Geai-Bleu (Terrebonne)
 du Méandre (L'Assomption) - Within the Édifice Mgr-Charlebois, an institutional school
 du Moulin (Repentigny)
 du Soleil-Levant (Mascouche)
 du Vieux-Chêne (Terrebonne)
 Émile-Nelligan (Repentigny)
 Entramis (Repentigny)
 Esther-Blondin (Terrebonne)
 Gareau (L'Assomption)
 Henri-Bourassa et Soleil-de-l'Aube (Repentigny) - alternative section
 Jean-De La Fontaine (Terrebonne) - within the Édifice Jean-De La Fontaine, an institutional school
 Jean-Duceppe (Repentigny)
 Jean-XXIII (Repentigny)
 la Majuscule (Repentigny)
 La Mennais (Mascouche)
 la Passerelle (Charlemagne)
 l'Arc-en-ciel (Terrebonne)
 la Tourterelle (Repentigny)
 le Bourg-Neuf (Repentigny)
 Le Castelet (Terrebonne)
 Léopold-Gravel (Terrebonne)
 Le Rucher (Mascouche)
 Longpré (Repentigny)
 Louis-Fréchette (Repentigny)
 Louis-Joseph-Huot (Repentigny) - within the Édifice Louis-Joseph-Huot, an institutional school
 Marie-Victorin (Repentigny)
 Mgr-Mongeau (L'Épiphanie)
 Pie-XII (Repentigny)
 Saint-Guillaume (L'Épiphanie)
 Saint-Joachim (Terrebonne)
 Saint-Louis (L'Assomption)
 Saint-Louis (Terrebonne)
 Tournesol (Repentigny)
 Valmont-sur-Parc (Repentigny)

References

External links
 Commission scolaire des Affluents 

Historical school districts in Quebec
Education in Lanaudière